The Access to Medical Reports Act 1988 (c.28) is an Act of the Parliament of the United Kingdom which applies to people in England, Wales and Scotland. It came into effect on 1 January 1989.

It gives patients the right to see reports written about them by a doctor for employment or insurance purposes with whom they have a normal doctor-patient relationship. Patients can see a report before it is submitted and request changes.  Access to a report can be withheld if the doctor thinks it likely to cause serious harm to the physical or mental health of the individual or others or indicate the intentions of the practitioner in respect of the individual, or to reveal the identity of another person who has supplied information.

The Access to Personal Files and Medical Reports (Northern Ireland) Order 1991 has similar effects.

References

Acts of the Parliament of the United Kingdom concerning healthcare
United Kingdom Acts of Parliament 1988
Medical records